Reginald Frederick "Reg" Williams (28 January 1922 – 6 October 2011) was an English professional footballer who played as a wing half.

Club career
Williams was named as Chelsea's oldest surviving player in February 2011.

Personal life
Williams' father, Reg "Skilly" Sr. was also a footballer, amassing almost 400 appearances for Watford. Two of his grandchildren, Danny and Darren Grieves, as well as Darren's son, Jack also went on to play football, with Jack currently playing for Watford.

Death
He died in October 2011.

References

1922 births
2011 deaths
Sportspeople from Watford
Footballers from Hertfordshire
English footballers
Association football midfielders
Watford F.C. players
Chelsea F.C. players